Jayasimha II (r.1015 – 1043 CE) (also known as Jagadhekamalla I and Mallikamoda) succeeded his brother Vikramaditya V on the Western Chalukya throne. He had to fight on many fronts, against the Cholas of Tanjore in the south and the Paramara dynasty in the north, to protect his kingdom. His rule however was an important period of development of Kannada literature. The Brahmin Kannada writers Durgasimha (who was also his minister and wrote the Panchatantra, "The five stratagems", 1031), Chavundaraya II (encyclopaedia, Lokopakara, c. 1025) and Kavitavilasa were in his patronage. Chandraraja, a Brahmin writer on erotics (Madanatilaka, "Forehead ornament of passion", the earliest Kannada work in the genre of erotica, c. 1025) was in the court of Machiraja, a vassal of Jayasimha II. The Jain Sanskrit scholar Vadiraja was in Jayasimha II's court and wrote two epics, on logic, and a commentary on an earlier Jain text. His queen Suggaladevi was a disciple of the Kannada saint-poet Devara Dasimayya (one of the earliest Veerashaiva poets).

According to the historians Chopra et al., this period saw Vengi fall firmly into the hands of the Cholas who would use their marital relations with the Eastern Chalukyas and their over lordship over Vengi to frustrate and threaten the Western Chalukyas from two fronts, from the east and from the South. However the historian Sen asserts that despite this reversal, this period saw the consolidation of the Western Chalukya power in the Deccan that would become a stepping stone towards the growth of the empire under the rule of Someshvara I, the successor of Jayasimha II.

Malwa invasion
The Paramara dynasty King Bhoja of Malwa wanted to avenge the defeat of his predecessor Munja and invaded the Chalukya kingdom from the north and annexed the northern Konkan and Lata (in modern Gujarat) for a few years. Bhillama III, a vassal king of the Seuna (Yadava) dynasty of Devagiri (modern Daulatabad) rebelled against Jayasimha II, perhaps with support from Bhoja. The historian Sen feels this invasion may have been caused by the confederacy of Bhoja, the Kalachuri ruler Gangeyadeva and Rajendra Chola. But Jayasimha II dealt successfully with these invasions and rebellion to recover all his northern territories by c.1024. Bhillama III married a daughter of Jayasimha II as an act of peace.

Wars with Cholas
During this period, Rajendra Chola was not only exerting control over the Vengi kingdom of the Eastern Chalukyas, he was also constantly trying to expand their kingdom northwards into the Western Chalukya territory. For a while the Cholas were preoccupied with their invasion of Ceylon (modern Sri Lanka) and with their territorial issues with the Pandyan Dynasty of Madurai, and the rulers of Kerala. Taking advantage of this confusion and with an intent of reducing Chola power in Vengi, Jayasimha II interfered in Vengi after the death of its incumbent King Vimaladitya and installed Vimaladitya's son of his choice, Vijayaditya II on the throne. Vijayaditya initially did well with this support by occupying Bezwada. This was against the plans of the Rajendra Chola who wanted Rajaraja Narendra, a prince born to Vimaladitya's queen from the Chola clan. To further strengthen himself, Jayasimha II had marched south of the Tungabhadra river and occupied Bellary, the Raichur Doab and perhaps part of Gangavadi (modern south-east Karnataka) as well. Rajendra Chola employed a two-pronged attack. One army going into the Vengi kingdom to successfully assist Rajaraja Narendra over his claims over the Vengi throne, and the other into the Western Chalukaya kingdom itself. In the west, Jayasimha II was defeated in the battle of Masangi (Maski in modern Raichur district) in c.1021. But the Chola army could not proceed any further and the Tungabhadra river remained the tacit border between the two empires.

Notes

References 

 

1042 deaths
11th-century Indian monarchs
Western Chalukya Empire